The 1980 Kansas City Royals season was their 12th in Major League Baseball. The Royals, under new manager Jim Frey, finished first in the American League West with a record of 97-65. Kansas City finally broke through in the postseason, sweeping the New York Yankees 3-0 in the 1980 American League Championship Series after falling to the Yankees in the ALCS in 1976, 1977 and 1978. The Royals lost to the Philadelphia Phillies 4-2 in the World Series.

George Brett had one of the best seasons in Major League Baseball history. Brett became the first Royals player to win a Most Valuable Player award, and his league-leading .390 batting average was the highest in the majors since Ted Williams hit .406 in 1941. Brett also led the team in home runs (24) and set a single-season franchise record with 118 runs batted in.

Offseason
 October 26, 1979: Keith Drumright was acquired by the Royals from the Houston Astros to complete an earlier deal (the Astros sent a player to be named later to the Royals for George Throop) made on April 27, 1979.

Regular season
On September 30, while pitching for the Seattle Mariners against the Royals, Rick Honeycutt taped a thumbtack to his finger to cut the ball. Royals baserunner Willie Wilson spotted the tack from second base. The umpires investigated and not only found the tack, but also a gash in Honeycutt's forehead. Honeycutt was ejected from the game, suspended for 10 games, and fined.

Opening Day starters
Willie Aikens
George Brett
Clint Hurdle
Pete LaCock
Dennis Leonard
Hal McRae
Jamie Quirk
U L Washington
Frank White
Willie Wilson

Season standings

Record vs. opponents

Notable transactions
 April 5, 1980: Eduardo Rodríguez was released by the Royals.
 June 16, 1980: Mark Huismann was signed by the Royals as an amateur free agent.
 June 17, 1980: Randy McGilberry was traded by the Royals to the New York Mets for Kevin Kobel.
 August 1980: Keith Drumright was purchased from the Royals by the Chicago Cubs.

Roster

Game log

Regular season

|-style=background:#fbb
| 5 || April 15 || 1:00p.m. CST || @ Orioles || L 2–12 || Palmer (2–0) || Leonard (0–2) || – || 2:32 || 50,199 || 3–2 || L1
|-style=background:#fbb
| 6 || April 16 || 6:30p.m. CST || @ Orioles || L 1–2 || Flanagan (1–1) || Gura (1–1) || – || 2:16 || 7,473 || 3–3 || L2
|-style=background:#fbb
| 7 || April 17 || 6:30p.m. CST || @ Orioles || L 2–5 || Stone (1–1) || Gale (0–1) || Stoddard (2) || 2:40 || 7,166 || 3–4 || L3
|-style=background:#cfc
| 14 || April 25 || 7:35p.m. CST || Orioles || W 7–0 || Gura (2–1) || Stone (1–2) || – || 2:18 || 20,436 || 8–6 || W3
|-style=background:#fbb
| 15 || April 26 || 7:35p.m. CST || Orioles || L 0–4 || Flanagan (2–2) || Gale (0–3) || – || 2:34 || 25,925 || 8–7 || L1
|-style=background:#cfc
| 16 || April 27 || 1:35p.m. CDT || Orioles || W 3–2 || Splittorff (3–0) || Ford (1–1) || – || 2:02 || 20,496 || 9–7 || W1
|-

|-style=background:#cfc
| 28 || May 12 || 7:00p.m. CDT || @ Yankees || W 12–3 || Gura (4–2) || Tiant (2–2) || Pattin (2) || 2:35 || 17,010 || 15–13 || W1
|-style=background:#cfc
| 29 || May 13 || 7:00p.m. CDT || @ Yankees || W 4–1 || Martin (3–1) || Griffin (0–2) || Quisenberry (5) || 2:29 || 20,107 || 16–13 || W2
|-style=background:#fbb
| 30 || May 14 || 7:00p.m. CDT || @ Yankees || L 3–16 || Guidry (3–0) || Leonard (2–4) || Figueroa (1) || 2:58 || 21,953 || 16–14 || L1
|-style=background:#cfc
| 34 || May 19 || 7:35p.m. CDT || Athletics || W 6–5  || Quisenberry (2–1) || Hamilton (0–1) || – || 3:37 || 28,889 || 19–15 || W3
|-style=background:#cfc
| 35 || May 20 || 7:35p.m. CDT || Athletics || W 1–0 || Gale (1–5) || Norris (5–2) || Quisenberry (7) || 2:13 || 23,698 || 20–15 || W4
|-style=background:#fbb
| 36 || May 21 || 7:35p.m. CDT || Athletics || L 2–4  || Lacey (1–0) || Quisenberry (2–2) || – || 4:14 || 24,030 || 20–16 || L1
|-style=background:#cfc
| 37 || May 22 || 7:35p.m. CDT || Athletics || W 16–3 || Martin (5–1) || Keough (5–4) || – || 2:44 || 23,124 || 21–16 || W1
|-style=background:#fbb
| 41 || May 26 || 3:30p.m. CDT || @ Athletics || L 1–4 || Keough (6–4) || Martin (5–2) || – || 2:33 || 21,882 || 24–17 || L1
|-style=background:#cfc
| 42 || May 27 || 9:30p.m. CDT || @ Athletics || W 4–2 || Leonard (4–4) || Kingman (2–5) || – || 3:03 || 4,488 || 25–17 || W1
|-style=background:#fbb
| 43 || May 28 || 3:30p.m. CDT || @ Athletics || L 3–6 || Langford (4–3) || Gale (1–6) || – || 2:33 || 4,094 || 25–18 || L1
|-

|-style=background:#fbb
| 47 || June 2 || 7:35p.m. CDT || Yankees || L 3–5 || Guidry (6–1) || Splittorff (3–3) || – || 2:42 || 39,261 || 27–20 || L2
|-style=background:#cfc
| 48 || June 3 || 7:35p.m. CDT || Yankees || W 6–5  || Quisenberry (4–2) || Davis (2–3) || – || 3:17 || 26,734 || 28–20 || W1
|-style=background:#cfc
| 49 || June 4 || 7:35p.m. CDT || Yankees || W 9–3 || Martin (7–2) || Tiant (4–3) || – || 2:29 || 27,234 || 29–20 || W2
|-style=background:#cfc
| 57 || June 13 || 7:30p.m. CDT || @ Brewers || W 4–3 || || || || 2:32 || 30,740 || 36–21 || W1
|-style=background:#fbb
| 58 || June 14 || 1:30p.m. CDT || @ Brewers || L 2–5 || || || || 2:51 || 50,605 || 36–22 || L1
|-style=background:#cfc
| 59 || June 15 || 1:30p.m. CDT || @ Brewers || W 7–2 || || || || 2:49 || 28,389 || 37–22 || W1
|-style=background:#fbb
| 64 || June 20 || 7:35p.m. CDT || Brewers || L 5–10 || || || || 3:02 || 38,179 || 39–25 || L2
|-style=background:#fbb
| 65 || June 21 || 7:35p.m. CDT || Brewers || L 1–5 || || || || 2:07 || 40,344 || 39–26 || L3
|-style=background:#cfc
| 66 || June 22 || 1:35p.m. CDT || Brewers || W 7–4 || || || || 2:33 || 39,592 || 40–26 || W1
|-style=background:#fbb
| 67 || June 23 || 7:35p.m. CDT || @ Twins || L 1–4 || || || || 2:23 || 7,525 || 40–27 || L1
|-style=background:#fbb
| 68  || June 24 || 5:05p.m. CDT || @ Twins || L 1–2 || || || || 2:31 || – || 40–28 || L2
|-style=background:#cfc
| 69  || June 24 || 8:11p.m. CDT || @ Twins || W 4–2 || || || || 2:37 || 11,556 || 41–28 || W1
|-style=background:#cfc
| 70 || June 25 || 7:35p.m. CDT || @ Twins || W 4–1 || || || || 2:04 || 9,150 || 42–28 || W2
|-style=background:#fbb
| 74 || June 30 || 7:35p.m. CDT || Twins || L 3–12 || || || || 2:41 || 33,540 || 44–30 || L2
|-

|-style=background:#fbb
| 75 || July 1 || 7:35p.m. CDT || Twins || L 1–2 || || || || 2:20 || 20,224 || 44–31 || L3
|-style=background:#cfc
| 76 || July 2 || 7:35p.m. CDT || Twins || W 4–3 || || || || 2:49 || 26,225 || 45–31 || W1
|-style=background:#bbbfff
|colspan="12"|51st All-Star Game in Los Angeles, CA
|-style=background:#fbb
| 83 || July 12 || 6:30p.m. CDT || @ Orioles || L 1–3 || Stone (13–3) || Martin (8–6) || Stoddard (12) || 2:46 || 41,514 || 49–34 || L1
|-style=background:#cfc
| 84 || July 13 || 1:00p.m. CDT || @ Orioles || W 5–1 || Gura (11–4) || Flanagan (8–8) || – || 2:46 || 21,311 || 50–34 || W1
|-style=background:#cfc
| 85 || July 14 || 6:30p.m. CDT || @ Orioles || W 8–4 || Splittorff (7–6) || McGregor (9–5) || Quisenberry (17) || 2:59 || 23,504 || 51–34 || W2
|-style=background:#cfc
| 89 || July 18 || 7:00p.m. CDT || @ Yankees || W 13–1 || Gura (12–4) || May (7–4) || – || 2:50 || 44,170 || 54–35 || W1
|-style=background:#fbb
| 90 || July 19 || 7:00p.m. CDT || @ Yankees || L 7–13 || Bird (1–0) || Splittorff (7–7) || Davis (6) || 3:01 || 53,583 || 54–36 || L1
|-style=background:#cfc
| 91 || July 20 || 1:00p.m. CDT || @ Yankees || W 14–3 || Gale (7–7) || Guidry (10–6) || Quisenberry (19) || 2:52 || 50,328 || 55–36 || W1
|-style=background:#cfc
| 96 || July 25 || 7:35p.m. CDT || Yankees || W 6–1 || Gale (8–7) || Tiant (6–4) || – || 2:31 || 40,039 || 59–37 || W3
|-style=background:#fbb
| 97 || July 26 || 7:35p.m. CDT || Yankees || L 4–5 || Gossage (4–0) || Leonard (10–8) || – || 2:41 || 41,860 || 59–38 || L1
|-style=background:#cfc
| 98 || July 27 || 1:35p.m. CDT || Yankees || W 8–0 || Gura (14–4) || John (15–4) || – || 2:28 || 40,057 || 60–38 || W1
|-

|-style=background:#fbb
| 112 || August 11 || 7:35p.m. CDT || Orioles || L 1–2 || Martínez (3–1) || Gura (16–5) || – || 2:33 || 41,334 || 70–42 || L1
|-style=background:#cfc
| 113 || August 12 || 7:35p.m. CDT || Orioles || W 4–3 || Quisenberry (9–4) || McGregor (13–6) || – || 2:26 || 34,913 || 71–42 || W1
|-style=background:#cfc
| 114 || August 13 || 7:35p.m. CDT || Orioles || W 6–1 || Gale (11–7) || Palmer (12–9) || – || 2:13 || 35,600 || 72–42 || W2
|-style=background:#cfc
| 125 || August 25 || 7:30p.m. CDT || @ Brewers || W 9–3 || || || || 2:57 || 15,912 || 81–44 || W3
|-style=background:#cfc
| 126 || August 26 || 7:30p.m. CDT || @ Brewers || W 7–6 || || || || 2:48 || 16,824 || 82–44 || W4
|-style=background:#cfc
| 127 || August 27 || 7:30p.m. CDT || @ Brewers || W 5–4 || || || || 2:19 || 18,815 || 83–44 || W5
|-

|-style=background:#fbb
| 132 || September 1 || 7:35p.m. CDT || Brewers || L 1–6 || || || || 2:49 || 28,597 || 85–47 || L1
|-style=background:#fbb
| 133 || September 3 || 7:35p.m. CDT || Brewers || L 1–3  || || || || 2:46 || 23,037 || 85–48 || L2
|-style=background:#fbb
| 134 || September 4 || 7:35p.m. CDT || Brewers || L 5–9 || || || || 2:43 || 21,898 || 85–49 || L3
|-style=background:#fbb
| 142 || September 12 || 9:30p.m. CDT || @ Athletics || L 5–9 || Langford (16–11) || Chamberlain (0–1) || – || 3:05 || 17,440 || 88–54 || L1
|-style=background:#fbb
| 143 || September 13 || 3:30p.m. CDT || @ Athletics || L 2–6 || McCatty (12–13) || Gura (18–7) || – || 2:37 || 11,253 || 88–55 || L2
|-style=background:#cfc
| 144 || September 14 || 3:30p.m. CDT || @ Athletics || W 4–3 || Splittorff (12–10) || Kingman (7–18) || Quisenberry (33) || 2:20 || 10,756 || 89–55 || W1
|-style=background:#cfc
| 148 || September 19 || 7:35p.m. CDT || Athletics || W 13–3 || Splittorff (13–10) || Kingman (7–19) || – || 2:30 || 29,493 || 92–56 || W2
|-style=background:#fbb
| 149 || September 20 || 7:35p.m. CDT || Athletics || L 0–9 || Keough (16–13) || Jones (0–1) || – || 2:43 || 37,523 || 92–57 || L1
|-style=background:#fbb
| 150 || September 21 || 1:35p.m. CDT || Athletics || L 3–9 || Norris (21–8) || Leonard (19–10) || – || 2:47 || 41,329 || 92–58 || L2
|-style=background:#fbb
| 154 || September 26 || 7:35p.m. CDT || @ Twins || L 0–3 || || || || 2:30 || 9,837 || 92–62 || L6
|-style=background:#fbb
| 155 || September 27 || 10:35a.m. CDT || @ Twins || L 3–8 || || || || 2:21 || 6,848 || 92–63 || L7
|-style=background:#fbb
| 156 || September 28 || 1:15p.m. CDT || @ Twins || L 7–8 || || || || 2:42 || 6,938 || 92–64 || L8
|-

|-style=background:#fbb
| 160 || October 3 || 7:35p.m. CDT || Twins || L 3–5 || || || || 2:29 || 20,714 || 95–65 || L1
|-style=background:#cfc
| 161 || October 4 || 7:35p.m. CDT || Twins || W 17–1 || || || || 2:42 || 23,751 || 95–66 || W1
|-style=background:#cfc
| 162 || October 5 || 1:35p.m. CDT || Twins || W 4–0 || || || || 2:05 || 25,603 || 95–67 || W2
|-

|- style="text-align:center;"
| Legend:       = Win       = Loss       = PostponementBold = Royals team member

Postseason Game log

|-style=background:#cfc
| 1 || October 8 || 2:00p.m. CDT || Yankees || W 7–2 || Gura (1–0) || Guidry (0–1) || – || 3:00 || 42,598 || KC 1–0 || W1
|-style=background:#cfc
| 2 || October 9 || 7:15p.m. CDT || Yankees || W 3–2 || Leonard (1–0) || May (0–1) || Quisenberry (1) || 2:51 || 42,633 || KC 2–0 || W2
|-style=background:#cfc
| 3 || October 10 || 7:15p.m. CDT || @ Yankees || W 4–2 || Quisenberry (1–0) || Gossage (0–1) || – || 2:59 || 56,588 || KC 3–0 || W3
|-

|-style=background:#fbb
| 1 || October 14 || 7:30p.m. CDT || @ Phillies || L 6–7 || Walk (1–0) || Leonard (0–1) || McGraw (1) || 3:01 || 65,791 || PHI 1–0 || L1
|-style=background:#fbb
| 2 || October 15 || 7:20p.m. CDT || @ Phillies || L 4–6 || Carlton (1–0) || Quisenberry (0–1) || Reed (1) || 3:01 || 65,775 || PHI 2–0 || L2
|-style=background:#cfc
| 3 || October 17 || 7:30p.m. CDT || Phillies || W 4–3  || Quisenberry (1–1) || McGraw (0–1) || – || 3:19 || 42,380 || PHI 2–1 || W1
|-style=background:#cfc
| 4 || October 18 || 12:45p.m. CDT || Phillies || W 5–3 || Leonard (1–1) || Christenson (0–1) || Quisenberry (1) || 2:37 || 42,363 || Tied 2–2 || W2
|-style=background:#fbb
| 5 || October 19 || 3:30p.m. CDT || Phillies || L 3–4 || McGraw (1–1) || Quisenberry (1–2) || – || 2:51 || 42,369 || PHI 3–2 || L1
|-style=background:#fbb
| 6 || October 21 || 7:20p.m. CDT || @ Phillies || L 1–4 || Carlton (2–0) || Gale (0–1) || McGraw (2) || 3:00 || 65,838 || PHI 4–2 || L2
|-

|- style="text-align:center;"
| Legend:       = Win       = Loss       = PostponementBold = Royals team member

Player stats

Batting

Starters by position
Note: Pos = Position; G = Games played; AB = At bats; R = Runs; H = Hits; 2B = Doubles; 3B = Triples; Avg. = Batting average; HR = Home runs; RBI = Runs batted in; SB = Stolen bases

Other batters
Note: G = Games played; AB = At bats; R = Runs; H = Hits; Avg. = Batting average; HR = Home runs; RBI = Runs batted in; SB = Stolen bases

Pitching

Starting pitchers
Note: G = Games pitched; IP = Innings pitched; W = Wins; L = Losses; ERA = Earned run average; BB = Walks allowed; SO = Strikeouts

Other pitchers
Note: G = Games pitched; IP = Innings pitched; W = Wins; L = Losses; SV = Saves; ERA = Earned run average; BB = Walks allowed; SO = Strikeouts

Relief pitchers
Note: G = Games pitched; IP = Innings pitched; W = Wins; L = Losses; SV = Saves; ERA = Earned run average; BB = Walks allowed; SO = Strikeouts

Postseason

ALCS

Game 1 
October 8 Royals Stadium

Game 2 
October 9 Royals Stadium

Game 3 
October 10 Yankee Stadium

World Series

Awards and honors
 George Brett – American League Batting Champion (.390)
 George Brett, Hutch Award

Farm system

LEAGUE CHAMPIONS: GCL Royals Blue

Notes

References

External links
1980 Kansas City Royals at Baseball Reference
1980 Kansas City Royals at Baseball Almanac

Kansas City Royals seasons
Kansas City Royals season
American League West champion seasons
American League champion seasons
Kansas City